Montreuil is a commune in the Eure-et-Loir department in northern France.

World War II
After the liberation of the area by Allied Forces in 1944, engineers of the Ninth Air Force IX Engineering Command began construction of a combat Advanced Landing Ground outside of the town.  Declared operational on 4 September, the airfield was designated as "A-38", it was used by the 363d Tactical Reconnaissance Group which flew photo-recon aircraft from the airfield until early October when the unit moved into Central France.  Afterward, the airfield was closed.

Population

See also
Communes of the Eure-et-Loir department

References

Communes of Eure-et-Loir